The men's 12.5 km pursuit competition of the 2015 Winter Universiade was held at the National Biathlon Centre in Osrblie on January 28.

Results

References 

Men's 12.5km